The men's double sculls rowing event at the 2011 Pan American Games will be held from October 15–17 at the Canoe & Rowing Course in Ciudad Guzman. The defending Pan American Games champion is Janier Concepción & Yoennis Hernández of Cuba.

Schedule
All times are Central Standard Time (UTC-6).

Results

Heat 1

Final A

References

Rowing at the 2011 Pan American Games